The Metropolitan Boston Hockey League was a youth hockey league founded March 31, 1977, and incorporated in Massachusetts in August 1979.

The MBHL was unique in youth hockey. The MBHL was classified as an "AAA" or "Tier I" league. Within the league, modified NCAA rules were played, the same as in U.S. college hockey. Slapshots and body checking were allowed at all age levels. The league believed that it was critical to develop those skills before young players had a chance to develop bad habits in their absence. A core belief of the MBHL was that hockey should be “played the way hockey is meant to be played, at any age and by either gender.”  The league was also open to young women who felt they were physically capable to "play Metro" with and against boys.

MBHL league play began the first weekend after Labor Day and concluded with playoffs in late March of the following year. No other Minor hockey organization in North America—or the world, permitted body checking or slapshots as early as the Mite level.

The MBHL had Twenty Two original organizations (some teams changed the team names): Assabet Valley Patriots, Acton Colonials, Bay State Sharks, formerly the Plymouth County All Stars, North Shore Raiders, Hobomock U.S.A. (became New England Falcons, now Bridgewater Bandits), The Worcester Crusaders, UMass Lowell River Hawks men's ice hockey (formerly Lowell Chiefs, then West River Wolves), Mass Bay Chiefs, formerly St. Moritz Devils and the Springfield Pics. The Bay State Breakers, Boston Jr. Eagles, Boston Jr. Terriers, West River Wolves, Bridgewater Bandits, Middlesex Islanders, Minuteman Flames, Providence Capitals (formerly Providence Friars), South Shore Kings, Merrimack Cardinals, and Top Gun all left the MBHL in 2004 for the Eastern Hockey Federation.

Upon the league's discontinuation after the end of the 2008–2009 season, most remaining teams transferred to the New England Hockey League, which has since been split into the Boston Hockey League and the Elite 9 Hockey League.

Teams
The MBHL had 9 Member Organization in its last season (see table at bottom).

High school programs fed
The MBHL feeds many High School programs.
Avon Old Farms School
Catholic Memorial School
Cushing Academy
Lawrence Academy at Groton
Malden Catholic High School
Matignon High School
Middlesex School
Phillips Andover Academy
Phillips Exeter Academy
Saint Peter-Marian High School
St. John's High School
St. John's Preparatory School
St. Mark's School
Saint Sebastian's School
Thayer Academy
Worcester Academy

Notable MBHL player alumni
NHL, AHL, other pro, NCAA Div I, or drafted

Players
Kyle Amaral
Tom Barasso
Allen Bourbeau
Phil Bourque
Bob Brooke
Doug Brown
Ed Campbell
Jim Campbell
Bob Carpenter
Eddie Caron
John Carter
Ted Crowley
Marvin Degon
John Doherty
Ted Donato
Hal Gill
Mike Grier
Bill Guerin
Ned Havern
Steve Heinze
Scott Horvath
Jeff Lazaro
Jordan LaVallee
John Lilley
Shawn McEachern
Jeff Norton
Joe Parker
James Pemberton
Jeff Pietrasiak
Tom Poti
Ron Haines [ice hockey]
Jeremy Roenick
Kevin Stevens
Bob Sweeney
Keith Tkachuk
Dan Travis
Noah Welch
Mike Ruggiero
Jim Carey
Scott Young
Teddy Doherty

Coaches
Bob Sweeney
Ulf Samuelsson
Scott Greer
Bobby Carpenter

References

External links
Official site

1977 establishments in Massachusetts
2009 disestablishments in Massachusetts
Defunct ice hockey leagues in the United States
Ice hockey in New England
Sports leagues disestablished in 2009
Sports leagues established in 1977
Ice hockey competitions in Massachusetts